Katahdin Falls is the tallest waterfall in Maine, in the United States, dropping up to 800 vertical feet (244 m) with a main drop of . It is located in Baxter State Park in Piscataquis County opposite of Witherlie Ravine, on Mount Katahdin on a tributary of Katahdin Stream.

Notes

Waterfalls of Maine
Landforms of Piscataquis County, Maine
Tiered waterfalls